Cosmoclostis aglaodesma is a species of moth of the family Pterophoridae. It is found in Australia from the Atherton Tableland in Queensland, south to near Taree in New South Wales.

The larvae feed on the flowers of Gmelina arborea and Tectona species.

References

External links
Cosmoclostis aclaodesma: Description of The Larva And Pupa (Pterophoridae: Pterophorinae: Pterophorini)

Pterophorini
Moths of Australia
Moths described in 1886